Parliamentary elections were held in Cameroon on 7 June 1970, the first since the country became a one-party state with the Cameroonian National Union (a merger of the Cameroonian Union of French Cameroon and the Kamerun National Democratic Party of Southern Cameroons) as the sole legal party in 1966. In each constituency the party put forward a list of candidates equal to the number of seats available, and ultimately won all 50 seats in the National Assembly with a 94.8% turnout.

Results

References

Cameroon
1970 in Cameroon
Elections in Cameroon
One-party elections
Single-candidate elections
June 1970 events in Africa